Polina Monova and Chantal Škamlová were the defending champions, but Monova chose not to participate. Škamlová played alongside Ágnes Bukta, but they lost in the first round to Katharina Gerlach and Julia Wachaczyk.

Cristina Dinu and Lina Gjorcheska won the title, defeating Olga Danilović and Georgina García Pérez in the final, 4–6, 7–5, [10–7].

Seeds

Draw

Draw

References
Main Draw

Ladies Open Hechingen - Doubles